Funny Girl is a 2014 novel by the British writer Nick Hornby. The book was adapted for television as Funny Woman, broadcast by Sky Max in 2023 starring Gemma Arterton.

Synopsis
The novel is about Barbara Parker, Miss Blackpool of 1964, who decides to abandon the idea of becoming a beauty queen. She heads for London, determined to make her mark as a television comedian, inspired by her idol Lucille Ball. After finding a job on a cosmetics counter in a London department store, she meets a theatrical agent, Brian Debenham, who finds her an audition for a television sitcom pilot based around the domestic life of a newlywed couple. Taking the name Sophie Straw, she becomes a star thanks to the leading role in the fiction Barbara (and Jim).

Reception
The Guardian praised the consistency of the lighthearted tone of the novel with the style of British comedy television in the 1960s, which Hornby defends resolutely. Similarly, The New York Times comments positively the position of the author towards pop culture, defining Hornby "competent and humane". The Independent criticized the change of focus in the novel, stating: "[...] it's a shame that Hornby abandons his funny girl halfway through for more of his hapless men."

Both the Los Angeles Times and the Library Journal report a level of flatness in the writing.

References

External links
Funny Girl at Nick Hornby's official website

2014 British novels
Novels by Nick Hornby
Novels set in England
Viking Press books